Hemibungarus calligaster is a species of venomous elapid snake, commonly known as the barred coral snake.

Distribution 
This species is endemic to the Philippines.

References 

Hemibungarus
Reptiles of the Philippines
Endemic fauna of the Philippines
Taxa named by Arend Friedrich August Wiegmann